The Defection of Simas Kudirka is a 1978 American made-for-television drama film based on actual events, featuring Alan Arkin as Simas Kudirka, a Lithuanian merchant seaman who attempts to defect from the Soviet Union to the United States by jumping onto a U.S. Coast Guard cutter. Among the movie's awards are two Emmys wins and three more Emmy nominations.  The movie was directed by David Lowell Rich.

Plot

The movie revolves around the true events of a Lithuanian man, Simas Kudirka, who was at the time a radio operator on a Soviet fish processing vessel. When his ship meets at sea with a U.S. Coast Guard cutter near Martha's Vineyard in 1970, Kudirka makes a dramatic leap from the deck, landing on the USCGC Vigilant. He announces that he wishes to defect, but confusion over U.S. policy on defections prevents the Americans from offering him asylum. As the crew of the Vigilant looks on, Soviet officers are allowed to board the cutter, beat and bind Kudirka, and drag him back to the Soviet ship. This tinderbox political incident occurs during a Soviet/U.S. conference over fishing rights.

Cast
Alan Arkin as Simas Kudirka
Richard Jordan as Commander Edward Devon
Donald Pleasence as Vladimir Popov
George Dzundza as Gruzauskas
Nicholas Guest as Baltrunar
Shirley Knight as Genna Kudirka
John McMartin as Phillip Chadway
Ted Shackelford as Blain
Barton Heyman as Dr. Paegle
Joyce Vining Morgan as Mrs. Paegle
Jack Blessing as Kabek

Production
The movie was filmed in Portsmouth, New Hampshire, the Portsmouth Naval Shipyard in Kittery, Maine, and off the coast of New Hampshire and southern Maine. The final scene shows Simas Kudirka (Arkin) and his wife Genna (Shirley Knight) reviewing the crew of the Coast Guard Cutter Vigilant, the ship onto which Kudirka jumped. The actual ship shown in the movie was the USCGC Decisive at its home port of New Castle, New Hampshire. The TS State of Maine, the training ship of Maine Maritime Academy in Castine, Maine was used as the Russian fish factory ship. Many students at MMA were extras as Russian crewmen.

Awards
In 1978, the movie won two Emmys and was nominated for another three.

Winners were:
Outstanding Directing in a Special Program - Drama or Comedy: Director David Lowell Rich
Outstanding Film Editing for a Special: John A. Martinelli

The nominated categories and nominees were:
Outstanding Achievement in Music Composition for a Special (Dramatic Underscore): David Shire
Outstanding Performance by a Supporting Actor in a Comedy or Drama Special: Donald Pleasence
Outstanding Writing in a Special Program - Drama or Comedy - Original Teleplay: Bruce Feldman

In 1979, the movie won an "Eddie" from the American Cinema Editors, USA, for Best Edited Television Special, awarded to John A. Martinelli.

Home media
The movie has been released on DVD on-demand format.

References

External links

 
 

1978 drama films
1978 television films
1978 films
American drama television films
American films based on actual events
CBS network films
Defection in fiction
Films about the United States Coast Guard
Films directed by David Lowell Rich
1970s English-language films
1970s American films